Racing Point is the Racing Point F1 Team, the Formula One team that has been competing in Formula One from the 2019 season.

Racing Point may also refer to:

 Racing Point Force India, the Formula One team that raced the second half of the 2018 season
 Racing Point UK, the  company that owns the Racing Point and Racing Point Force India teams

See also

 
 Force India, the team whose car and facilities Racing Point Force India used
 Racing (disambiguation)
 Point (disambiguation)